Koilodepas calycinum is a species of plant in the family Euphorbiaceae. It is endemic to Tamil Nadu in India, and is endangered due to habitat loss.

References

Epiprineae
Flora of Tamil Nadu
Endangered plants
Taxonomy articles created by Polbot